Reichenbachiella versicolor is a Gram-negative, strictly aerobic and rod-shaped bacterium from the genus of Reichenbachiella which has been isolated from the alga Gracilaria blodgettii from the coast of Lingshui County.

References

Cytophagia
Bacteria described in 2018